General Strong may refer to:

Frederick S. Strong (1855–1935), U.S. Army major general
George Crockett Strong (1832–1863), Union Army brigadier general, posthumously promoted to major general
George Veazey Strong (1880–1946), U.S. Army major general
Kenneth Strong (1900–1982), British Army major general
Robert William Strong Jr. (1917–2006), U.S. Air Force major general
Robert William Strong Sr. (1890–1975), U.S. Army brigadier general
William Kerley Strong (1805–1867)m Union Army brigadier general